These are the Billboard Hot 100 number-one hits of 1985. The two longest running number-one singles of 1985 are "We Are the World" by USA for Africa and "Say You, Say Me" by Lionel Richie which each logged four weeks at number-one. "Say You, Say Me" logged two weeks at number-one in 1985 and two more additional weeks in 1986, reaching a total of four. "Like a Virgin" by Madonna concluded a six-week run that started in 1984.

That year, 17 acts first hit number one, such as Foreigner, USA for Africa, Simple Minds, Tears for Fears, Bryan Adams, Paul Young, Huey Lewis and the News, John Parr, Dire Straits, Ready for the World, a-ha, Whitney Houston, Jan Hammer, Starship, Marilyn Martin, and Mr. Mister. George Michael, having already hit number one with Wham!, also earns his first number one song as a solo act. Madonna, Wham!, Phil Collins, and Tears for Fears were the only acts to have more than one song reach number one, with Phil Collins having the most with three, while the others have two. 

This was also a record year for British acts with 13 hits reaching the top spot. As of 2022 this record remains unbroken.

Chart history

Number-one artists

See also
1985 in music
List of Cash Box Top 100 number-one singles of 1985

References

Additional sources
Fred Bronson's Billboard Book of Number 1 Hits, 5th Edition
Joel Whitburn's Top Pop Singles 1955-2008, 12 Edition
Joel Whitburn Presents the Billboard Hot 100 Charts: The Eighties
Additional information obtained can be verified within Billboard's online archive services and print editions of the magazine.

United States Hot 100
1985